The Rega Institute for Medical Research is a Belgian scientific establishment that is part of the Catholic University of Leuven (Leuven) in central Belgium. The Rega Institute is an interfacultary biomedical research institute of the Catholic University of Leuven and consists of departments of medicine and pharmacology.

Divisions
 Molecular Bacteriology
 Clinical and Epidemiological Virology
 Immunobiology
 Medicinal Chemistry
 Molecular Immunology
 Virology and Chemotherapy

History
The Rega Institute was founded in 1954 within the unitary Catholic University of Leuven by Pieter De Somer, who named it for Henri-Joseph Rega, a Professor at the Old University of Leuven in the 18th century. The building of the Rega Institute was constructed in 1954 and paid by the company Recherche et Industrie Thérapeutiques (R.I.T.) in Rixensart, where Dr. De Somer had a leading function. During the sixties, De Somer withdrew  from R.I.T. and in 1968 he became the founder and first rector of the Dutch-speaking Katholieke Universiteit te Leuven. From 1970 on the Rega Institute has worldwide cooperations with a lot of industrial companies. Since 1985, after rector P. De Somer died, the management of the Institute consists of professors from the laboratories housed in the Institute.

In 1987, the Rega Institute entered into a cooperation with Janssen Pharmaceutica (led by Dr. Paul Janssen). This collaboration would result in the discovery of a totally new class of HIV Reverse Transcriptase (RT) inhibitors, the so-called Non-Nucleoside RT Inhibitors or NNRTI's. NNRTIs distinguish themselves of the NRTI's because they do not bind at the catalytic place of the enzyme (i.e. the place where the normal substrate binds himself, such as dATP, dGTP, dCTP or dTTP) but to another, allosteric binding site. The NNRTIs block the normal enzymatic activity of the RT and thereby interrupt the replication cycle of HIV. As a result of the "Rega-Janssen" cooperation several prototypes of NNRTIs, among which the so-called TIBO ("TetrahydroImidazoBenzodiazepinOne") and alpha-APA (Alpha-AnilidoPhenylAcetamide) derivatives were created. This research, in cooperation with Tibotec, resulted in a particular powerful anti-HIV compound, Rilpivirine (TMC-278). NNRTIs are at the moment considered one of the essential ingredients of so-called anti-HIV cocktails. The best well-known NNRTIs are nevirapine and efavirenz.

References
 Balzarini J, Celen S, Karlsson A, de Groot T, Verbruggen A, Bormans G., The effect of a methyl or 2-fluoroethyl substituent at the N-3 position of thymidine, 3'-fluoro-3'-deoxythymidine and 1-beta-D-arabinosylthymine on their antiviral and cytostatic activity in cell culture, Antivir Chem Chemother. 2006;17(1):17-23.
 De Clercq E., Chemotherapy of the acquired immune deficiency syndrome (AIDS): non-nucleoside inhibitors of the human immunodeficiency virus type 1 reverse transcriptase, Int J Immunopharmacol. 1991;13 Suppl 1:83-9.
 De Clercq E., Perspectives of non-nucleoside reverse transcriptase inhibitors (NNRTIs) in the therapy of HIV-1 infection, Farmaco. 1999 Jan-Feb;54(1-2):26-45.
 Rudi Pauwels, Koen Andries, Jan Desmyter, Dominique Schols, Michael J. Kukla, Henry J. Breslin, Alfons Raeymaeckers, Jozef Van Gelder, Robert Woestenborghs, Jozef Heykants, Karel Schellekens, Marcel A. C. Janssen, Erik De Clercq,  Paul A. J. Janssen, Potent and selective inhibition of HIV-1 replication in vitro by a novel series of TIBO derivatives, Nature 343, 470 - 474 (1 February 1990).

Achievements
The Nucleoside analogs, d4T, 3'-fluoro-3'-deoxythymidine (FLT) and 3'-fluorodideoxyguanosine (FLG), and the NNRTI's 1-[(2-hydroxy-ethoxy) methyl]-6-phenylthiothymine (HEPT), tetrahydro-imidazo[4,5,1-jk][1,4]-benzodiazepine-2(1H)-one and -thione (TIBO) and alpha-anilinophenylacetamide (alpha-APA) were first described at the Rega Institute. The anti-viral drugs Brivudine and Tenofovir were discovered at the Rega Institute.

External links

 Rega Institute for Medical Research

Medical research institutes in Belgium
Catholic universities and colleges in Belgium
Research institutes established in 1954
Education in Leuven
KU Leuven